Lauren Barfield (born March 15, 1990) is an American volleyball player, a member of the club Schweriner SC.

Sporting achievements

Clubs 
Austrian Championship:
  2013
German Championship:
  2017, 2018
  2019
German SuperCup:
  2017, 2018
German Cup:
  2019

References

External links
 Women.Volleybox profile
 Volleyball-Bundesliga profile
 CEV profile
 GoHuskies profile

1990 births
People from Tacoma, Washington
Living people
American women's volleyball players
Middle blockers
Expatriate volleyball players in Austria
Expatriate volleyball players in Poland
Expatriate volleyball players in Germany
American expatriate sportspeople in Austria
American expatriate sportspeople in Poland
American expatriate sportspeople in Germany
21st-century American women
Washington Huskies women's volleyball players